Devil's Hill (1958) is a novel for children by Australian author Nan Chauncy, illustrated by Geraldine Spence.  It was joint winner of the Children's Book of the Year Award: Older Readers in 1959.'Plot outline

This novel is a sequel to the author's previous novel Tiger in the Bush'' and is the second of two by the author concentrating on the Lorenny family, who live deep in the rainforest in south-western Tasmania. 

The Lorenny family are hosts to their city cousins, Sam and his two younger sisters. The children set off through the bush in search of a lost cow and the novel tracks the conflicts between the city and country children and the gradual change of those from the city.

Critical reception

In an overview of Chauncy's children's books dealing with the Australian bush, Susan Sheridan and Emma Maguire noted that in this novel: "...children and adults inhabit the same enchanted bush space, and the emphasis is on what can be achieved there, rather than on threats from the Outside in the form of scientists and loggers." And they concluded "...Chauncy’s treatment of the theme of entering into masculinity in the Badge Lorenny novels is subtly altered by her emphasis on learning from the bush through an attitude of attentive love. In retrospect, it is also possible to discern in her work the effects of an emerging, ecologically sensitive way of seeing human relationships to the environment."

See also

 1958 in Australian literature

References

Australian children's novels
1958 Australian novels
Novels set in Tasmania
CBCA Children's Book of the Year Award-winning works
1958 children's books